Crenavolva philippei is a species of sea snail, a marine gastropod mollusc in the family Ovulidae, the ovulids, cowry allies or false cowries.

Description
The length of the shell attains 8.2 mm.

Distribution
This species occurs in the Indian Ocean off Réunion.

References

 Lorenz, F. & Fehse, D., 2009 - The living Ovulidae. A manual of the families of allied cowries: Ovulidae, Pediculariidae and Eocypraeidae, p. 651 pp

Ovulidae
Gastropods described in 2009